Assen Bossev (22 November 1913 – 24 April 1997) was a prominent Bulgarian author of children's literature, as well as a translator from Russian.

He was born in the village of Ruska Bela, Vratsa region. He was educated there as well as in the town of Berkovitsa. Afterwards Bossev was a teacher for a certain period of time. He settled in Sofia, where he graduated in law and diplomacy.

Soviet Russian poet Yelizaveta Tarakhovskaya translated most of Bossev's poetry into Russian.

1913 births
1997 deaths
Bulgarian writers
Bulgarian children's writers
Bulgarian male writers
People from Vratsa Province